David Edward Blewitt (August 7, 1928 – July 8, 2010) was an American Academy Award-nominated and Emmy-winning film editor, whose credits included Ghostbusters in 1984.  Blewitt earned an Academy Award nomination for his work on The Competition in 1980.

Blewitt was born in Los Angeles, California, on August 7, 1928. He began his career in the entertainment industry by working as an usher at the Orpheum Theatre in Los Angeles when he was 15 years old. Blewitt enlisted in the United States Army Air Forces during World War II, where he worked as an aerial reconnaissance photographer.

Blewitt returned to Los Angeles after World War II, where he initially worked as a cinematographer. His cinematography television credits included Hollywood and the Stars.

He transitioned to film editing when he joined David L. Wolper Productions where he met, and often collaborated with, Jack Haley Jr. Their joint productions included  That's Entertainment! in 1974, That's Entertainment, Part II in 1976 and Life Goes to War: Hollywood and the Home Front. Blewitt's other credits with Wolper Prods. included Movin' With Nancy and The Undersea World of Jacques Cousteau.

Blewitt's larger, feature film credits included Butterflies Are Free, a 1972 film starring Goldie Hawn, and The Buddy Holly Story in 1978. He received an Academy Award nomination for The Competition, directed by Joel Oliansky. Blewitt was best associated with his editing in the 1984 blockbuster, Ghostbusters.

Blewitt's later television work included Hercules: The Legendary Journeys.

Blewitt won an Emmy Award in 1993 for editing in the television special, Bob Hope: The First 90 Years. In addition to his Emmy and Academy Award nominations, Blewitt received two ACE Eddie Awards from the American Cinema Editors, out of a total five nominations during his 40-year career. He was also a recipient of the American Cinema Editors Career Achievement Award in 2004.

David Blewitt died of complications from Parkinson's disease on July 8, 2010, at his home in Sherman Oaks, California, at the age of 81. He was survived by his wife, Ann; daughter, Risa Bastien, and Risa's husband, Steve Bastien; and his granddaughter, Annabel.

References

External links

1928 births
2010 deaths
American film editors
American cinematographers
United States Army Air Forces personnel of World War II
People from Los Angeles
People from Sherman Oaks, Los Angeles
Deaths from Parkinson's disease
Neurological disease deaths in California
Emmy Award winners
American Cinema Editors
United States Army Air Forces soldiers
American war photographers